Goxhill may refer to:

 Goxhill, East Riding of Yorkshire
 Goxhill, Lincolnshire
 RAF Goxhill, former Air Force station